Amaury Vassili Chotard (born 8 June 1989) is a French opera singer and professional tenor. His debut album Vincerò from 2009 went double platinum in France, and he has had international success with releases in Canada, South Africa and South Korea.

Biography
Amaury Vassili Chotard was born in Rouen, Upper Normandy, and began singing around the age of 9 years, enrolled by his mother at a musical school in Rouen, created by Albert and Elizabeth Amsallem. At 14, Vassili competed in his first singing contest, where he won in singing "Amsterdam" by Jacques Brel (an idol of Vassili). In Vassili's second contest, in front of a full house, he sang "Les Lacs du Connemara" by Michel Sardou; however he did not qualify for the final, despite receiving a standing ovation from the crowd. During the contest, his mother realised how much he enjoyed being on the stage and especially the impact he had on the public, saying "C'est son truc !" ("it's his thing!").
In 2004, Vassili took first place in the Coupe de France de la chanson française.

He became famous with his debut album Vincerò from 2009, which went double platinum (over 250,000 copies) after a worldwide release. His second album Canterò was released in November 2010. Vassili describes his music style as "lyrical pop".

Eurovision Song Contest 2011
On 27 January 2011, it was announced by the French broadcaster France Télévisions, that Vassili would be the French entry at the Eurovision Song Contest 2011 to be held in Düsseldorf, Germany. The song was revealed as "Sognu", and was performed in Corsican. It marks the second French Eurovision entry to be performed in the language after Patrick Fiori received fourth place with "Mama Corsica" in 1993.

Vassili eventually placed 15th with 82 points.

After Eurovision-present
Vassili was the spokesperson for France during the Eurovision Song Contest 2012 and presented the country's voting results.
He participated on the French version of the Masked Singer as Turtle and became the first male contestant to win the show.

Discography

Albums

Singles

Other songs

References

External links

Official website 

1989 births
Living people
Musicians from Rouen
Eurovision Song Contest entrants of 2011
Eurovision Song Contest entrants for France
French operatic tenors
Opera crossover singers
Warner Music France artists
21st-century French singers
21st-century French male singers